Garden Hill is the second largest of three reserves of the Island Lake region of Manitoba.

Garden Hill First Nations (Oji-Cree: ᑭᐢᑎᑲᐣᐘᒋᐣᐠ, Kistiganwacheeng), the reserve's First Nations community, is located in the northeast section of the Canadian province of Manitoba on the shore of Island Lake.

Garden Hill had a population of 2,776 in the 2011 Canadian census. The residents of Garden Hill speak Oji-Cree and English. It is only accessible by winter ice roads via St. Theresa Point and by air. Nearby on Island Lake are the communities of Wasagamack of the Wasagamack First Nation, St. Theresa Point of the St. Theresa Point First Nation, and the northern settlement of Island Lake.

History
In the early 1900s, there were no chiefs, but there were leaders called "headmen". They earned their status by establishing a reputation for generosity, service, wisdom, spirituality, courage, diplomacy, dignity, loyalty and personal magnetism. These leaders achieved status by influence, not by possession of wealth, but by the distribution of it. The shared generosity because of beliefs, values, traditions, and customs required by this behaviour. The chief with the longest time in the position was Henry Fiddler, who held the position of Chief for 22 years from 1931 to 1953.

Garden Hill First Nations once belonged to the Island Lake band, who, on 13 August 1909, became a signatory of Treaty 5. In 1969, Island Lake split into four separate communities with their own separate administrations: Wasagamack, Red Sucker Lake, St. Theresa Point, and Garden Hill First Nations. Today, the four communities have a Tribal Council, called Island Lake Tribal Council, to collaborate on common interests.

Demographics 

The population of Garden Hill was 2,776 in the 2011 Canadian census an increase of 46.3% from 2006. In 2006 there were 1,898 residents. There were a total of 595 private dwellings. The population density was 33.7 per square kilometre on a land area of 82.48 square kilometres. The median age was 18.9.

Garden Hill First Nations 

Garden Hill First Nations is a First Nations community, and a signatory of Treaty 5. As of February 2015, Garden Hill First Nations had a registered population of 4,567 with 3918 members living on reserve and 649 members living off reserve.
Members elect a chief, vice chief and seven councillors through a Custom Electoral System.

Reserve lands 
Garden Hill First Nations has the following seven reserves:

Education
There are two schools in Garden Hill. The elementary school is named Kistiganwacheeng Elementary School and the secondary school is called Garden Hill First Nation High School.
Garden Hill Student Services office is located in Winnipeg, the office handles post-secondary students that attend various institutions.

Gallery

Notable members

References

External links
 Map of Garden Hill First Nation at Statcan

Island Lake Tribal Council
First Nations in Northern Region, Manitoba
Indian reserves in Northern Region, Manitoba